Monika Schnarre (born May 27, 1971) is a Canadian model, actress and television host.  She is reportedly 185.4 cm (6′1″) tall.

In 1986, at age 14, Schnarre won the Ford Models "Supermodel of the World" contest, becoming the youngest model to ever win. She appeared on the cover of American Vogue at 14 and in the Sports Illustrated Swimsuit Issue at 15.

In 1989, she wrote a book about her modelling experiences titled Monika: Between You and Me.

She became an actress, appearing in over 50 film and television roles including The Bold and the Beautiful and Beastmaster, and made guest appearances on Beverly Hills 90210, Andromeda, Caroline in the City, The King of Queens and Cracked. Schnarre has also made a number of movies, with roles in Love on the Side, Waxwork II: Lost in Time and Junior.  She played Oxanna Kristos in the video game Command & Conquer: Tiberian Sun.

Schnarre went on to study television broadcast journalism at University of California, Los Angeles, and was co-host of Celebrity RSVP, a Canadian entertainment news program. She also was a guest correspondent on etalk and ET Canada.

In 2007, Schnarre became a volunteer Ambassador for Habitat for Humanity Toronto's Women Build program. Schnarre resides in Toronto and Muskoka, Ontario.

In 2014, Schnarre launched her line of natural anti-aging skincare products.

As of 2022 Schnarre is working as a real estate advisor for Engel & Völkers.

Personal life

Schnarre attended Woburn Collegiate to get her diploma and finished with honours. After that, she moved to California to pursue a career in acting. 

She married Storey Badger in 2010, and subsequently divorced.  
Her son, Bode, was born on May 8, 2013.

Filmography

Film

Television

References

External links

1971 births
Living people
Actresses from Toronto
Female models from Ontario
Canadian film actresses
Canadian television actresses
People from Scarborough, Toronto